= Kedai Buluh =

Coordinates: 5°15′3.38″N 103°7′36.71″E

Kedai Buluh (Jawi: كداي بولوه) is a small town in the district of Kuala Terengganu in Terengganu, Malaysia.
